USS Forrest Sherman (DDG-98) is an  guided missile destroyer in the United States Navy and is the second US Navy ship to bear the name. She is part of Destroyer Squadron 28.

Namesake
She is named for Admiral Forrest Percival Sherman.

Construction
Built by Northrop Grumman Ship Systems Ingalls Shipbuilding in Pascagoula, Mississippi, Forrest Sherman was launched on 2 October 2004. Admiral Sherman's daughter, Ann Sherman Fitzpatrick, is the ship's sponsor.

History
She was commissioned on 28 January 2006 at NAS Pensacola, Commander Michael VanDurick in command, and six days later departed for her homeport in Norfolk, Va. to join the Atlantic Fleet.

She departed Norfolk for her maiden deployment in July 2007, visiting various nations around the Mediterranean Sea and the Black Sea. In August 2007, while the ship was visiting Sevastopol to conduct drills with the Ukrainian Navy, a  naval mine from the Second World War was discovered 500 yards from the vessel. The mine was secured before it could damage the ship. Also during that visit, she became the first US Navy ship to land a
Ukrainian Navy helicopter. She also conducted Reliant Mermaid 2007 with the Turkish and Israeli Navies.

On that deployment, she circumnavigated the continent of Africa as part of Task Group 60.5, the US Navy's Southeast Africa task force.  She returned home on 19 December that year.

In early June 2008, Forrest Sherman deployed for three months in support of U.S. Southern Command's Partnership of the Americas 2008 (POA 08) operation. She returned home on 29 August 2008.

On 25 November 2019, Forrest Sherman captured a stateless dhow carrying two 358 missiles and a large cache of Iranian missile parts destined for Yemen.

On 13 April 2022, Forrest Sherman arrived at Norfolk following a surge deployment.

On 11 June 2022, Forrest Sherman departed Norfolk for a NATO Deployment. Forrest Sherman is to assume the role of flagship of Standing NATO Maritime Group 2.

References

External links

 Official ship's site
 

 

Arleigh Burke-class destroyers
Destroyers of the United States
Ships built in Pascagoula, Mississippi
2004 ships